On the Councils and the Church (1539) is a treatise on ecclesiology written by Protestant reformer Martin Luther late in life.

On the Councils and the Church is best known for its teaching, in the third part of the book, of the "seven marks of the Church", of which the One Holy Catholic and Apostolic Church can be recognized. These marks are:
holy word of God, effective means of grace
holy sacrament of baptism, regeneration
holy sacrament of the altar
office of keys exercised publicly, although not the office of pope. Includes also private confession as a means of grace.
it consecrates or calls ministers, or has offices, that is, to administer, bishops, pastors, and preachers.
prayer, public praise, and thanksgiving to God, the liturgy
holy possession of the sacred cross, suffering and carrying the cross as followers of Christ.

English translation
Luther's Works: vol. 41

See also

Four Marks of the Church

External links
Authority of Councils and Churches. tr. by C.B. Smyth. London: William Edward Painter, 1847.

Works by Martin Luther
Ecclesiology
1539 books
16th-century Christian texts